Cowboy Bebop is a 1998 Japanese anime series.

Cowboy Bebop may also refer to:

 Cowboy Bebop (1998 video game), a 1998 video game for PlayStation
 Cowboy Bebop: Tsuioku no Serenade, a 2005 video game for PlayStation 2
 Cowboy Bebop: The Movie, a 2001 animated film
Cowboy Bebop (2021 TV series), a Netflix live-action remake of the 1998 anime

See also
 Music of Cowboy Bebop